{{DISPLAYTITLE:C13H18ClNO}}
The molecular formula C13H18ClNO (molar mass: 239.74 g/mol, exact mass: 239.1077 u) may refer to:

 Bupropion
 Lometraline

Molecular formulas